St. Johns is the smallest settlement on Saba and is located between The Bottom and Windwardside. It was the birthplace of Cornelia Jones.

Geography
St. Johns is primarily a residential area, but also contains both schools on the island, the Sacred Heart School (primary education) and Saba Comprehensive School (secondary education).

Sights
Attached to the Sacred Heart School is a small chapel that is run by Father Janssen. It is common to see the chapel used by the school on weekdays for religious class and on Sunday for mass.

See also
Mount Scenery

References

External links

Populated places in Saba